Cristian Fabián Díaz Sichi (born 18 May 1976 in Buenos Aires) is an Argentine retired footballer who played as a central defender.

Football career
After beginning his career with native Club Atlético Platense, 21-year-old Díaz moved to Spain in 1997, going on to remain in the country the following 12 seasons. Two years earlier, he was picked to represent Argentina at the FIFA U-20 World Cup, with the national team winning the tournament in Qatar after defeating Brazil 2–0; during his career, he was nicknamed Camioncito (Little Truck).

Díaz started with Atlético Madrid, all but representing the reserve side during his spell – the exception to this was on 14 April 1998, when he started in a 0–0 away draw against S.S. Lazio for the semi-finals of the UEFA Cup where he was charged with marking Alen Bokšić, excelling in the task as the Spaniards lost 0–1 on aggregate. Also in the second division (where he played with Atlético B), he represented Málaga CF, Elche CF, UD Salamanca, Sporting de Gijón, Ciudad de Murcia and Granada 74 CF – who rose from the ashes of Ciudad – retiring at CF Atlético Ciudad in the third level at the age of 33.

In the 1998–99 campaign, Díaz achieved his biggest team success, winning La Liga promotion with Andalusia's Málaga. He only contributed with five matches to this feat, however, having arrived during the winter break.

After retiring, Díaz worked as assistant to Granada CF president Quique Pina.

Honours

Club
Málaga
Segunda División: 1998–99

International
Argentina
FIFA U-20 World Cup: 1995

References

External links

1976 births
Living people
Argentine sportspeople of Spanish descent
Footballers from Buenos Aires
Argentine footballers
Association football defenders
Argentine Primera División players
Club Atlético Platense footballers
Segunda División players
Segunda División B players
Atlético Madrid B players
Atlético Madrid footballers
Málaga CF players
Elche CF players
UD Salamanca players
Sporting de Gijón players
Ciudad de Murcia footballers
Granada 74 CF footballers
Argentina under-20 international footballers
Argentine expatriate footballers
Expatriate footballers in Spain
Argentine expatriate sportspeople in Spain